Zaaf Cycling Team is a Spanish women's road cycling team that was founded in 2022.

References

Cycling teams based in Spain
Cycling teams established in 2022